Thomas Albert Jennings (January 8, 1865  – March 16, 1917) was a Florida politician.

He was born in Jennings, Florida.  He attended Florida public schools and Emory College. He was president of the Bank of Jennings and moved to Pensacola, Florida and ran the Jennings Naval Stores Company.  Jennings was a delegate to the Democratic National Convention in 1888, 1892, 1908 and 1912 and an elector in 1904.  He was chair of the Pensacola Board of Public Works in 1909.  In 1910, he was elected to represent Escambia County, Florida in the Florida House of Representatives and was Speaker of the Florida House of Representatives in 1911. He opened the Globe Naval Stores Company in 1913 and was a director of the Gulf, Florida, and Alabama Railway.

References

External links
 

1865 births
1917 deaths
Emory University alumni
Speakers of the Florida House of Representatives
Democratic Party members of the Florida House of Representatives
People from Hamilton County, Florida
20th-century American politicians
People from Pensacola, Florida
1904 United States presidential electors